The Ford Aerospace AN/AVQ-26 Pave Tack is an electro-optical targeting pod for military attack aircraft. It uses a laser and a forward looking infrared to find and designate targets for laser-guided bombs and other precision-guided munitions. Pave Tack's images are routed to a cockpit display, usually for the weapon systems officer.

History
Pave Tack was developed in the late 1970s and entered service in 1982, and was initially used by the USAF McDonnell Douglas F-4 Phantom II and General Dynamics F-111C Aardvark strike aircraft. Its combat debut came in 1986 during Operation El Dorado Canyon's air raid against Libya by F-111F aircraft stationed at RAF Lakenheath, England. F-111s used it to great effect in the Gulf War of 1991, both against fixed targets and against tanks.

F-4 crews called Pave Tack "Pave Drag" because it was carried externally. Pave Tack is a large installation, with the pod alone weighing some 1,385 lb (629 kg) and measuring 166 inches (4,220 mm) in length. On the F-4, the size of the pod meant that it had to be carried on the centerline station in place of the standard drop tank; it imposed a substantial aerodynamic drag penalty and was generally unpopular. The F-111C and F-111F carried the Pave Tack pod on a rotating carriage in its internal bomb bay, retracting it when not in use to reduce drag and protect the sensors from damage.

About 150 AVQ-26 pods were built, substantially less than originally planned. The last USAF Pave Tacks were withdrawn with the retirement of the F-111 in 1996.

The Royal Australian Air Force (RAAF) purchased ten Pave Tack pods in 1980 for its F-111 fleet. All 24 F-111Cs were wired for the pod, although there were not enough pods for all to be simultaneously equipped. Following the retirement of the USAF's F-111F in 1996 the RAAF purchased surplus pods to equip each of its F-111Cs to carry its own.

The Republic of Korea Air Force (RoKAF) ordered an initial batch of eight pods in 1984 for delivery in 1987. It may have subsequently obtained additional pods from USAF surplus. The RoKAF uses the pods on its F-4 Phantoms.

See also
 Pave Penny
 Pave Knife
 Pave Spike
 LANTIRN

References

External links
Ford Aerospace AN/AVQ-26 Pave Tack on APA

Targeting pods
Equipment of the United States Air Force
Military electronics of the United States
Military equipment introduced in the 1980s